Round Rock Christian Academy is a private Christian PK-12th grade school in Round Rock, Texas, United States.

History 
Round Rock Christian Academy began as a preschool, King David Children's Center, in 1975 by Westside Baptist Church. When Westside changed its name to Lake Creek in 1986, the school was renamed Lake Creek Baptist Academy and its new mascot was the Lion. In 1994, Lake Creek then merged with Northeast Baptist Church to form the present-day Central Baptist Church, with the school being renamed once again. The current name was adopted in 1998 to communicate the school's broader mission of educating all students regardless of denomination or religion. The original mission and philosophy statements were composed in 1990. The first minor revision was approved by the school board in 1998 and the most recent significant revision was made in 2009. The vision statement was added in 2000. In December 2010, the school became separate from Central Baptist Church to become its own entity. Although legally separate, the school and the church still maintain a close working relationship. RRCA has worked with architects to create a master planned campus to be built on the back part of the existing property.  The school purchased part of the property from Central Baptist Church and is currently raising funds through the Building Future Leaders campaign for the construction costs.

Programs
The school has extra-curricular offerings including Athletics, Fine Arts, and Academic competitions.   Crusader Athletics includes football, volleyball, cross-country, basketball, cheerleading, swim, golf, tennis, track and field, soccer, and baseball. Selected students participate in the PSIA academic contest, which allows elementary and middle school students to compete in spelling, writing, math, and speech events in competition with other area private schools. High school students can participate in the TAPPS Academic contest. Several of the electives choices offered include Drama, Choir, Art, Needle Arts, Computer Programming, and Study Hall. The school also has a Student Council that is elected each year by the student body. For high school students on the Advanced Diploma plan, college classes are available. National Elementary Honor Society, National Junior Honor Society, National Honor Society, and National Art Honor Society programs are offered to qualifying students.  There is also an after school chess club offered.

Notable alumni 
 Madison Burge, actress

References

External links 
RRCA website

Christian schools in Texas
Round Rock, Texas
Private K-12 schools in Texas
1975 establishments in Texas
Educational institutions established in 1975
Schools in Williamson County, Texas